Sulphur High School is a 5A public high school located in Sulphur, Louisiana, United States. It is a part of Calcasieu Parish Public Schools. The students are offered a variety of Advanced Placement courses as well as opportunities for dual enrollment in classes at McNeese State University in Lake Charles, Louisiana. The Principal for the main campus is David Pool.  The school has a Ninth Grade Campus which opened its doors in the 2004–2005 school year, and its principal is Katherine Clophus.

Athletics
Sulphur High athletics competes in the LHSAA.

Championships
Football championships
(4) State Championships: 1943, 1944, 1946, 1965

Notable alumni
J. T. Chargois, baseball player
Marcus R. Clark (Class of 1974), justice of the Louisiana Supreme Court
Casey Daigle, baseball player
Janice Lynde, actress, original cast member of the CBS soap opera The Young and the Restless for three years, then went on to ABC's One Life to Live and NBC's Another World
Pat Rapp, baseball player
John Thomson, baseball player
Martin Zeno, professional basketball player

References

External links
 Sulphur High School Website
 Ninth Grade Campus Website

Public high schools in Louisiana
Schools in Calcasieu Parish, Louisiana